Psalm 102 is the 102nd psalm of the Book of Psalms, beginning in English in the King James Version: "Hear my prayer, O LORD, and let my cry come unto thee." In Latin, it is known as "Domine exaudi orationem meam".

In the slightly different numbering system used by the Greek Septuagint version of the bible and the Latin Vulgate, this psalm is Psalm 101.

This psalm is part of the fourth of the five biblical books of Psalms and is one of the seven penitential psalms. It begins the final section of the three traditional divisions of the Latin psalms, and for this reason the first words ("Domine exaudi orationem meam et clamor meus ad te veniat...") and above all the initial "D" are often greatly enlarged in illuminated manuscript psalters, following the pattern of the Beatus initials at the start of Psalm 1. In the original Hebrew, the first verse introduces the psalm as "A prayer of the poor man" or "A prayer of the afflicted". The New King James Version has a longer sub-title, "A Prayer of the afflicted, when he is overwhelmed and pours out his complaint before the Lord."

Background and themes

Midrash Tehillim quotes Rabbi Pinchas, who notes that in some psalms David calls himself by name, as in "A prayer of David" (e.g. Psalm 17 and 86), but here he calls himself "the afflicted", as in "A prayer of the afflicted". Rabbi Pinchas explains that when David foresaw the righteous men who would descend from him—Asa, Jehoshaphat, Hezekiah, Isaiah—he called himself David. But when he perceived the wicked men who would be his descendants—Ahaz, Manasseh, Amon—he called himself "the afflicted".

In a greater context in the flow of Psalms,  there are  seven calls to praise with Psalms 95 though 100 immediately leading up to Psalm 102 and in the writer commits to do that in  Ps 101. To the reader Psalm 102 may feel an unexpected out of place lament.  By title 'A Prayer of one afflicted, when he is faint and pours out his complaint before the Lord."  In this case in the flow weeping is set before praising.  What follows in the flow of Psalms is addressing self with truth as a basis of praise. "Bless the Lord Oh my soul' in Ps 103  and Ps 104.

Text

Hebrew Bible version
Following is the Hebrew text of Psalm 102:

King James Version 
 Hear my prayer, O LORD, and let my cry come unto thee.
 Hide not thy face from me in the day when I am in trouble; incline thine ear unto me: in the day when I call answer me speedily.
 For my days are consumed like smoke, and my bones are burned as an hearth.
 My heart is smitten, and withered like grass; so that I forget to eat my bread.
 By reason of the voice of my groaning my bones cleave to my skin.
 I am like a pelican of the wilderness: I am like an owl of the desert.
 I watch, and am as a sparrow alone upon the house top.
 Mine enemies reproach me all the day; and they that are mad against me are sworn against me.
 For I have eaten ashes like bread, and mingled my drink with weeping.
 Because of thine indignation and thy wrath: for thou hast lifted me up, and cast me down.
 My days are like a shadow that declineth; and I am withered like grass.
 But thou, O LORD, shalt endure for ever; and thy remembrance unto all generations.
 Thou shalt arise, and have mercy upon Zion: for the time to favour her, yea, the set time, is come.
 For thy servants take pleasure in her stones, and favour the dust thereof.
 So the heathen shall fear the name of the LORD, and all the kings of the earth thy glory.
 When the LORD shall build up Zion, he shall appear in his glory.
 He will regard the prayer of the destitute, and not despise their prayer.
 This shall be written for the generation to come: and the people which shall be created shall praise the LORD.
 For he hath looked down from the height of his sanctuary; from heaven did the LORD behold the earth;
 To hear the groaning of the prisoner; to loose those that are appointed to death;
 To declare the name of the LORD in Zion, and his praise in Jerusalem;
 When the people are gathered together, and the kingdoms, to serve the LORD.
 He weakened my strength in the way; he shortened my days.
 I said, O my God, take me not away in the midst of my days: thy years are throughout all generations.
 Of old hast thou laid the foundation of the earth: and the heavens are the work of thy hands.
 They shall perish, but thou shalt endure: yea, all of them shall wax old like a garment; as a vesture shalt thou change them, and they shall be changed:
 But thou art the same, and thy years shall have no end.
 The children of thy servants shall continue, and their seed shall be established before thee.

Textual witnesses
Some early manuscripts containing the text of this chapter in Hebrew are of the Masoretic Text tradition, which includes the Aleppo Codex (10th century), and Codex Leningradensis (1008).

The extant palimpsest Aq includes a translation into Koine Greek by Aquila of Sinope in c. 130 CE, containing verses 16–29.

Verse 24
I said, “O my God,Do not take me away in the midst of my days;
Your years are throughout all generations.
There is a similar sentiment in :

Uses

Judaism
Psalm 102 is one of 15 psalms recited as additional hymns during the Yom Kippur service by Sephardi Jews.

Verse 1 is recited by the sheaves of barley in Perek Shirah.

Verse 14 is said in Selichot. Sephardi Jews recite verse 14 after the prayer of Ein Keloheinu in the morning service. This verse is also used as a popular Jewish song called Atah takum, with the refrain ki va moed.

Psalm 102 is said in times of community crisis. It is also recited as a prayer for a childless woman to give birth. In the Siddur Sfas Emes, this psalm is said as a prayer "for the well-being of an ill person".

New Testament
Verses 25-27 are quoted in Hebrews  as an argument that Jesus is superior to the angels and making Psalm 102 in some sense both prayer to and praise concerning Jesus.

Catholic and Anglican
Verse 1, with some other psalm verses (such as 124:8), has a prominent place in Catholic and Anglican liturgies, where it is split as an antiphon into a "call" ("Lord, listen to my prayer", or "Hear my prayer, O Lord") and the response ("and let my cry come unto Thee").

This psalm occurs in the Monastic office of St Benedict (480-547) in the Saturday Vigil or Matins. It occurs in the same place in the Roman Breviary of St Pius V (1568) and occurs at Saturday Terce in the Roman Breviary of St Pius X (1911). In the revised office of Pope Paul VI (1971), the Psalm occurs on Tuesday in Week 4 of the  Office of Readings.

In the Book of Common Prayer of the Church of England and liturgies derived from them, Psalm 102 is sung or said at Mattins on the 20th day of each month.

Musical settings 
The second verse is set in the first part of Hear my prayer, O Lord, an anthem composed in 1682 by Henry Purcell, using the translation of the Book of Common Prayer.

Verses 25b-28 (interspersed with Psalm 90) form the text of Jochen Klepper's 1938 Neujahrslied (New Years' Song).

In contemporary music, the Psalm was used in Semler's song titled "Psalm 102" from their 2021 EP "Late Bloomer".

References

Sources

External links 

 
 
 Psalms Chapter 102 תְּהִלִּים text in Hebrew and English, mechon-mamre.org
 Text of Psalm 102 according to the 1928 Psalter
 Psalm 102 – The Pilgrim’s Love and Longing for God and His House text and detailed commentary, enduringword.com
 For the leader; "upon the gittith." A psalm of the Korahites. text and footnotes, usccb.org United States Conference of Catholic Bishops
 Psalm 102:1 introduction and text, biblestudytools.com
 Charles H. Spurgeon: Psalm 102 detailed commentary, archive.spurgeon.org
 Psalm 102 at biblegateway.com
 Hymns for Psalm 102 hymnary.org
 Recording of melody for verse 14 ("Rise up, comfort Zion") on Zemirot Database

102